Gastón Andrés Javier Cellerino Grasso (born 26 June 1986) is an Argentine footballer that currently plays for Tercera División RFEF side Rápido de Bouzas as a forward.

Club career
Although a supporter of rival club River Plate, Cellerino began his career at Boca Juniors football academy. In January 2007, he left the Boca youth ranks and joined Peruvian first-tier side Universidad San Martín, where he helped the team claim the league title. Shortly afterward, he went on trial with Peñarol but failed to make the team.

Cellerino then signed for Chilean Primera División club Rangers to play the Torneo de Apertura. In his second season, he was runner-up to Lucas Barrios in scoring with 16 goals. however, his most spectacular goal occurred in the playoffs first-leg semifinal against Palestino, when his goal from a bicycle kick was applauded by the referee Carlos Chandía.

On 25 January 2009, it was reported that Cellerino would move to Serie B club Livorno, after refusing other offers from Lazio and Chilean powerhouse Colo-Colo previously. In January 2010, Celta Vigo signed him from Livorno on loan to play in the Liga Adelante. He was loaned again in June 2011 to Argentina's Racing Club, which would mark his first professional spell in his homeland.

On 10 February 2012, after being released by Livorno, Cellerino returned to Chile and signed for first-tier Unión La Calera.

On August 17, 2015, the New York Cosmos announced they had signed Cellerino.

Honours
New York Cosmos
 North American Soccer League (1): 2015

Ligorna 1922
 Eccellenza Liguria (1): 2020–21

References

External links
 Statistics at Irish Times
 Cellerino at Football Lineups
 nycosmos.com
 New York Cosmos profile
 

1986 births
Living people
People from Viedma
Argentine sportspeople of Italian descent
Argentine footballers
Argentine expatriate footballers
Club Deportivo Universidad de San Martín de Porres players
Rangers de Talca footballers
U.S. Livorno 1915 players
RC Celta de Vigo players
Racing Club de Avellaneda footballers
Unión La Calera footballers
Santiago Wanderers footballers
New York Cosmos (2010) players
Club Bolívar players
Felda United F.C. players
Deportivo Pasto footballers
Real Balompédica Linense footballers
Deportes Temuco footballers
Rápido de Bouzas players
Peruvian Primera División players
Chilean Primera División players
Serie B players
Serie A players
Segunda División players
Argentine Primera División players
North American Soccer League players
Bolivian Primera División players
Malaysia Super League players
Categoría Primera A players
Segunda División B players
Primera B de Chile players
Eccellenza players
Tercera Federación players
Association football forwards
Expatriate footballers in Peru
Expatriate footballers in Chile
Expatriate footballers in Italy
Expatriate footballers in Spain
Expatriate soccer players in the United States
Expatriate footballers in Bolivia
Expatriate footballers in Malaysia
Expatriate footballers in Colombia
Argentine expatriate sportspeople in Peru
Argentine expatriate sportspeople in Chile
Argentine expatriate sportspeople in Italy
Argentine expatriate sportspeople in Spain
Argentine expatriate sportspeople in the United States
Argentine expatriate sportspeople in Bolivia
Argentine expatriate sportspeople in Malaysia
Argentine expatriate sportspeople in Colombia